This is a list of song-related list articles on Wikipedia. In music, a song is a musical composition for voice or voices, performed by singing or alongside musical instruments. A choral or vocal song may be accompanied by musical instruments, or it may be unaccompanied, as in the case of a cappella songs. The lyrics (words) of songs are typically of a poetic, rhyming nature, though they may be religious verses or free prose.

By artist
See 

  List of songs recorded by Arijit Singh
  List of songs recorded by 2PM
  List of songs recorded by 311
  List of songs recorded by 4Minute
  List of songs recorded by 911
  List of songs recorded by A-Teens
  List of songs recorded by Aaliyah
  List of songs recorded by Adele
  List of songs recorded by Aerosmith
  List of songs recorded by Ariana Grande
  List of songs recorded by Die Ärzte
  List of songs recorded by After School
  List of songs recorded by Christina Aguilera
  List of songs recorded by AKB48
  List of songs recorded by Fiona Apple
  List of songs recorded by Arch Enemy
  List of songs recorded by Arctic Monkeys
  List of songs recorded by Badlees
  List of songs recorded by Syd Barrett
  List of songs recorded by the Beach Boys
  List of songs recorded by Beady Eye
  List of songs recorded by the Beatles
  List of songs recorded by The Bee Gees
  List of songs recorded by Belinda
 Drake discography
  List of songs recorded by Drake Bell
Lil Skies discography
Lil Pump discography
Katy Perry discography
Mac Miller discography
Kodak Black discography
Blueface discography
Juice Wrld discography
  List of songs recorded by Beyoncé
  List of songs recorded by Björk
  List of songs recorded by Corbin Bleu
  List of songs recorded by Blink-182
  List of songs recorded by Blur
  List of songs recorded by Bon Jovi
  List of songs recorded by Bright Eyes
  List of songs recorded by Brotherhood of Man
  List of songs recorded by Bucks Fizz
  List of songs recorded by Alexandra Burke
  List of songs recorded by Kate Bush
  List of songs recorded by Mariah Carey
  List of songs recorded by The Carpenters
  List of songs recorded by Johnny Cash
  List of songs recorded by The Cheetah Girls
  List of songs recorded by The Chemical Brothers
  List of songs recorded by Jay Chou
  List of songs recorded by Chrisye
  List of songs recorded by Kelly Clarkson
  List of songs recorded by The Clash
  List of songs recorded by Coldplay
  List of songs recorded by Cheryl Cole
  List of songs recorded by Collective Soul
  List of songs recorded by Common
  List of songs recorded by Perry Como
  List of songs recorded by Harry Connick, Jr.
  List of songs recorded by Nikka Costa
  List of songs recorded by Miley Cyrus
  List of songs recorded by Dalida
  List of songs recorded by The Darkness
  List of songs recorded by A Day to Remember
  List of songs recorded by De/Vision
  List of songs recorded by Lana Del Rey
  List of songs recorded by Destiny's Child
  List of songs recorded by Dido
  List of songs recorded by Celine Dion
  List of songs recorded by DJ Quik
  List of songs recorded by Dragonette
  List of songs recorded by Dream Theater
  List of songs recorded by Electric Light Orchestra
  List of songs recorded by Elisa
  List of songs recorded by Sophie Ellis-Bextor
  List of songs recorded by Embrace
  List of songs recorded by Envy & Other Sins
  List of songs recorded by the Everly Brothers
  List of songs recorded by Exo
  List of songs recorded by f(x)
  List of songs recorded by Faith No More
  List of songs recorded by Mylène Farmer
  List of songs recorded by Sky Ferreira
  List of songs recorded by Fightstar
  List of songs recorded by Flyleaf
  List of songs recorded by Foo Fighters
  List of songs recorded by Sergio Franchi
  List of songs recorded by Free
  List of songs recorded by Zubeen Garg
  List of Genesis medleys
  List of songs recorded by Keith Getty
  List of Bengali songs recorded by Shreya Ghoshal
  List of Kannada songs recorded by Shreya Ghoshal
  List of Malayalam songs recorded by Shreya Ghoshal
  List of songs recorded by Shreya Ghoshal
  List of Tamil songs recorded by Shreya Ghoshal
  List of Telugu songs recorded by Shreya Ghoshal
  List of songs recorded by Ghost
  List of songs recorded by Girls Aloud
  List of songs recorded by Girls' Generation
  List of songs recorded by Goldfrapp
  List of songs recorded by Ellie Goulding
  List of songs recorded by Green Day
  List of songs recorded by Guillemots
  List of songs recorded by Guns N' Roses
  List of songs recorded by Hadouken!
  Emmylou Harris appearances
  Emmylou Harris collaborations A–F
  Emmylou Harris collaborations G–K
  Emmylou Harris collaborations L–Q
  Emmylou Harris collaborations R–Z
  List of songs recorded by George Harrison
  List of Hillsong songs
  List of songs recorded by Hollywood Undead
  List of songs recorded by Whitney Houston
  List of songs recorded by Iron Maiden
  List of songs recorded by J.B.O.
  List of songs recorded by The Jackson 5
  List of songs recorded by Michael Jackson
  List of songs recorded by Jay-Z
  List of songs recorded by Blind Willie Johnson
  List of songs recorded by JoJo
  List of songs recorded by Jonas Brothers
  List of songs recorded by Ada Jones
  List of songs recorded by Joy Division
  List of songs recorded by Junoon
  List of songs recorded by JYJ
  List of songs recorded by Kara
  List of songs recorded by Kasabian
  List of songs recorded by Keane
  List of songs recorded by Kent
  List of songs recorded by Alicia Keys
  List of songs recorded by Morgana King
  List of songs recorded by Kings of Leon
  List of songs recorded by Kavita Krishnamurthy
  List of Songs recorded by Kavita Krishnamurthy in South-Indian languages 
  List of songs recorded by Kishore Kumar
  List of songs recorded by Talib Kweli
  List of songs recorded by Lady Gaga
  List of songs recorded by Cyndi Lauper
  List of songs written and performed by Avril Lavigne
  List of songs recorded by Lead Belly
  List of songs recorded by Huey Lewis and the News
  List of songs recorded by Leona Lewis
  List of songs recorded by Liberty X
  List of songs recorded by Linkin Park
  List of songs recorded by Led Zeppelin
  List of songs recorded by Jennifer Lopez
  List of songs recorded by Lorde
  List of songs recorded by Lostprophets
  List of songs recorded by Mike Love
  List of songs recorded by Mallu Magalhães
  List of songs recorded by Magnapop
  List of songs recorded by Marina and the Diamonds
  List of songs recorded by Maroon 5
  List of songs recorded by Bruno Mars
  List of songs recorded by Mireille Mathieu
  List of songs recorded by Mayday Parade
  List of Paul McCartney maxi-singles
  List of songs recorded by McFly
  List of songs recorded by Memphis Minnie
  List of songs recorded by Nimal Mendis
  List of songs recorded by Mentors
  List of songs recorded by MGMT
  List of songs recorded by Milva
  List of songs recorded by Mina
  List of songs recorded by Nicki Minaj
  List of songs recorded by the Misfits
  List of songs recorded by Mizraab
  List of songs recorded by Modern Talking
  List of songs recorded by Monica
  List of songs recorded by Mos Def
  List of songs recorded by Mumford & Sons
  List of songs recorded by Muse
  List of songs recorded by My Bloody Valentine
  List of songs recorded by My Chemical Romance
  List of songs recorded by Mýa
  List of songs recorded by Nadia Ali
  List of songs recorded by Udit Narayan
  List of songs recorded by The Narrative
  List of songs recorded by Natalia Kills
  List of songs recorded by Newsboys
  List of songs recorded by Jason Newsted
  List of songs recorded by Nickelback
  List of songs recorded by Nightwish
  List of songs recorded by Nirvana
  List of songs recorded by No Angels
  List of songs recorded by Noisettes
  List of songs recorded by Brandy Norwood
  List of songs recorded by Oasis
  List of songs recorded by Phil Ochs
  List of songs recorded by The Offspring
  List of songs recorded by Oh Land
  List of songs recorded by One Direction
  List of songs recorded by Patti Page
  List of songs recorded by Paramore
  List of songs recorded by Anuradha Paudwal
  List of songs recorded by Katy Perry
  List of songs recorded by Washington Phillips
  List of songs recorded by Phish
  List of songs recorded by Pink Floyd
  List of songs recorded by Pink Martini
  List of songs recorded by Pixies
  List of songs recorded by Plan B
  List of songs recorded by the Pogues
  List of songs recorded by Elvis Presley
  List of Elvis Presley hit singles
  List of Elvis Presley international hit singles
  List of songs recorded by Elvis Presley on the Sun label
  List of songs recorded by Puddle of Mudd
  List of songs recorded by The Pussycat Dolls
  List of songs recorded by Queen
  List of songs recorded by Radiohead
  List of songs recorded by Mohammed Rafi
  List of songs recorded by Mohammed Rafi (A)
  List of songs recorded by Mohammed Rafi (B–C)
  List of songs recorded by Mohammed Rafi (D–F)
  List of songs recorded by Mohammed Rafi (G)
  List of songs recorded by Mohammed Rafi (H–I)
  List of songs recorded by Mohammed Rafi (J)
  List of songs recorded by Mohammed Rafi (K)
  List of songs recorded by Mohammed Rafi (L)
  List of songs recorded by Mohammed Rafi (M)
  List of songs recorded by Mohammed Rafi (N)
  List of songs recorded by Mohammed Rafi (O)
  List of songs recorded by Mohammed Rafi (P–R)
  List of songs recorded by Mohammed Rafi (S)
  List of songs recorded by Mohammed Rafi (T)
  List of songs recorded by Mohammed Rafi (U–Z)
  List of songs recorded by Rainbow (South Korean band)
  List of songs recorded by The Rasmus
  List of songs recorded by Raven-Symoné
  List of songs recorded by Red Hot Chili Peppers
  List of songs recorded by Blind Joe Reynolds
  List of songs recorded by Damien Rice
  List of songs recorded by Rihanna
  List of songs recorded by Rise Against
  List of songs recorded by Kelly Rowland
  List of songs recorded by Roxette
  List of songs recorded by Rush
  List of songs recorded by Saint Etienne
  List of songs recorded by Kumar Sanu
  List of songs recorded by The Saturdays
  List of songs recorded by Jack Savoretti
  List of songs recorded by Nicole Scherzinger
  List of songs recorded by Scissor Sisters
  List of songs recorded by Secret
  List of songs recorded by The Seekers
  List of songs recorded by Selena
  List of songs recorded by Selena Gomez & the Scene
  List of songs recorded by Shakira
  List of songs recorded by Ringo Sheena
  List of songs recorded by Shinee
  List of songs recorded by Simon & Garfunkel
  List of songs recorded by Frank Sinatra
  List of songs recorded by Sinn Sisamouth
  List of songs recorded by Sissel Kyrkjebø
  List of songs recorded by Sistar
  List of songs recorded by Slade
  List of songs recorded by Slipknot
  List of songs recorded by Sy Smith
  List of songs recorded by The Smiths
  List of songs recorded by Regina Spektor
  List of songs recorded by Stateless
  List of songs recorded by Status Quo
  List of songs recorded by Stereophonics
  List of songs recorded by Rachel Stevens
  List of songs recorded by The Stone Roses
  List of songs recorded by Tinchy Stryder
  List of songs recorded by Sucioperro
  List of songs recorded by Sugababes
  List of songs recorded by Supertramp
  List of songs recorded by Skye Sweetnam
  List of songs recorded by Taylor Swift
  List of songs recorded by The Sword
  List of songs recorded by T-ara
  List of songs recorded by Take That
  List of songs recorded by Therapy?
  List of songs recorded by Thirty Seconds to Mars
  List of songs recorded by Justin Timberlake
  List of songs recorded by Ashley Tisdale
  List of songs recorded by Tokio Hotel
  List of songs recorded by Tokyo Jihen
  List of songs recorded by Travis
  List of songs recorded by Oliver Tree
  List of songs recorded by TVXQ
  List of songs recorded by U2
  List of songs recorded by Usher
  List of songs recorded by Carrie Underwood
  List of songs recorded by Steve Vai
  List of songs recorded by The Velvet Underground
  List of songs recorded by Julieta Venegas
  List of songs recorded by Rufus Wainwright
  List of songs recorded by Kanye West
  List of songs recorded by Westlife
  List of songs recorded by The White Stripes
  List of songs recorded by The Who
  List of songs recorded by The Wiggles
  List of songs recorded by Robbie Williams
  List of songs recorded by Brian Wilson
  List of songs recorded by Carl Wilson
  List of songs recorded by Dennis Wilson
  List of songs recorded by Wolf Alice
  List of songs recorded by Wolfmother
  List of songs recorded by Alka Yagnik
  List of songs recorded by "Weird Al" Yankovic
  List of songs recorded by ZOEgirl

Cover songs

  List of cover versions of Jacques Brel songs
  List of songs covered by the Beatles
  List of cover versions of the Beatles songs
  List of cover versions of Black Sabbath songs
  List of Czech cover versions of songs
  List of cover versions of Depeche Mode songs
  List of artists who have covered Bob Dylan songs
  List of Grateful Dead cover versions
  List of cover versions of Michael Jackson songs
  List of cover versions of Led Zeppelin songs
  List of cover versions of The Miracles songs
  List of Live Lounge cover versions
  List of cover versions of Misfits songs
  List of artists who have covered Van Morrison songs
  List of S.H.E covers and parodies
  List of Phish cover versions
  List of cover versions of U2 songs
  List of Westlife covers

By dance
List of twist songs

Film
  List of songs based on a film
  List of songs featured in Shrek

By genre

 Christmas music
 List of calypsos with sociopolitical influences
 List of Eurodance songs
 List of Hi-NRG artists and songs
 The History of Rock and Roll contents
 List of Italo disco artists and songs
 List of jazz standards
 List of Latin freestyle musicians and songs
 List of mashup songs
 List of murder ballads
 List of post-disco artists and songs
 List of power pop artists and songs
 List of quiet storm songs
 List of rock instrumentals
 List of soft rock artists and songs
 List of songs based on poems
 List of UK garage songs

By geography

Countries
 List of number-one songs in Norway

Patriotic songs

  Armenian revolutionary songs
 List of Bangladeshi patriotic songs
  List of Bosnia and Herzegovina patriotic songs
  List of anthems of non-sovereign countries, regions and territories
  List of England football team songs
  List of historical national anthems
  List of national anthems
  List of Singaporean patriotic songs

Anthems

  List of historical national anthems
  List of anthems of non-sovereign countries, regions and territories
  List of anthems of Venezuela
  List of national anthems
  Anthems of the autonomous communities of Spain
  List of U.S. state songs

Cities

  List of songs about cities
  List of songs about Amsterdam
  List of songs about Berlin
  List of songs about Copenhagen
  List of songs about Dubai
  List of songs about Dhaka
  List of songs about Hamburg
  List of songs about Jerusalem
  List of songs about Manila
  List of songs about Moscow
  List of songs about Paris
  List of songs about Stockholm
  List of songs about Tokyo

Australian cities
  List of songs about Melbourne
  List of songs about Sydney

Canadian cities
  List of songs about Montreal
  List of songs about Toronto
  List of songs about Vancouver

English cities
  List of songs about Birmingham
  List of songs about Liverpool
  List of songs about London
  List of songs about London (L)
  List of songs about Manchester

Indian cities
  List of songs about Delhi
  List of songs about Kolkata
  List of songs about Mumbai
  List of songs about Bareilly
  List of songs about Chennai
  List of songs about Madras
  List of songs about Ahmedabad
  List of songs about Lucknow
  List of songs about Bangalore

Irish cities
  List of songs about Cork
  List of songs about Dublin

U.S. cities

  List of songs about Atlanta
  List of songs about Birmingham, Alabama
  List of songs about Boston
  List of songs about Chicago
  List of songs about Detroit
  List of songs about Los Angeles
  List of songs about Miami
  List of songs about Nashville
  List of songs about New Orleans
  List of songs about New York City
  List of songs about Portland, Oregon
  List of songs about Seattle

States and provinces
  List of Newfoundland songs

Number-one songs

 Lists of number-one songs
 List of number-one songs in Norway

By producer

 List of songs produced by Dallas Austin
 List of songs produced by Ester Dean
 List of songs written or produced by Naughty Boy
 List of songs produced by Rico Love
 List of songs produced by Jeff Lynne
 List of songs produced by Stock Aitken Waterman

Rated

  1974 NME Critics End of Year Poll
  Rolling Stone's 500 Greatest Songs of All Time
  AFI's 100 Years...100 Songs
  B92 Top 100 Domestic Songs
  Songs of the Century
  Festive Fifty
  50 Tracks
  50 Tracks: The Canadian Version
  The Pitchfork 500
  Rock Express Top 100 Yugoslav Rock Songs of All Times
  Top 2000
  List of music considered the worst

By session musician
  List of recordings of songs Hal Blaine has played on
  List of recordings of songs Earl Palmer has played on

By songwriters
See 

 Discography of Audie Murphy
 List of Irving Berlin songs (chronological)
 List of songs and arias of Johann Sebastian Bach
 List of songs composed by Franz Schubert
 List of songs composed by Jerome Kern
 List of songs written by Alicia Keys
 List of songs written by Ashford & Simpson
 List of songs written by Audie Murphy
 List of songs written by B.I
 List of songs written by Babyface
 List of songs written by Barry Mann and Cynthia Weil
 List of songs written by Bernie Taupin
 List of songs written by Berry Gordy
 List of songs written by Bob Crewe
 List of songs written by Bob Dylan
 List of songs written by Bonnie McKee
 List of songs written by Brett James
 List of songs written by Bruno Mars
 List of songs written by Burt Bacharach
 List of songs written by Cathy Dennis
 List of songs written by Cole Porter
 List of songs written by Craig Wiseman
 List of songs written by David Foster
 List of songs written by David Lee Murphy
 List of songs written by Dennis Linde
 List of songs written by Desmond Child
 List of songs written by Diane Warren
 List of songs written by Doc Pomus and Mort Shuman
 List of songs written by Dottie Rambo
 List of songs written by Emeli Sandé
 List of songs written by Frank J. Myers
 List of songs written by Frank Ocean
 List of songs written by G-Dragon
 List of songs written by Gary Barlow
 List of songs written by Goffin and King
 List of songs written by Gregg Alexander
 List of songs written by Hank Williams
 List of songs written by Holland, Dozier and Holland
 List of songs written by Hyuna
 List of songs written by Irving Berlin
 List of songs written by Isaac Hayes and David Porter
 List of songs written by Jack Keller
 List of songs written by Jeff Barry and Ellie Greenwich
 List of songs written by Jeffrey Steele
 List of songs written by Jerry Leiber and Mike Stoller
 List of songs written by Jimmy Jam and Terry Lewis
 List of songs written by John Rich
 List of songs written by Kenny Gamble and Leon Huff
 List of songs written by Kenzie
 List of songs written by Kim Hee-chul
 List of songs written by Kim Jong-hyun
 List of songs written by Kostas
 List of songs written by L.A. Reid (1983–1993)
 List of songs written by Lee Donghae
 List of songs written by Lynsey de Paul
 List of songs written by Natasha Bedingfield
 List of songs written by Norman Whitfield
 List of songs written by P. G. Wodehouse
 List of songs written by Paul Simon
 List of songs written by Pebe Sebert
 List of songs written by Phil Vassar
 List of songs written by Ravi
 List of songs written by Roger Cook and Roger Greenaway
 List of songs written by Shane McAnally
 List of songs written by Smokey Robinson
 List of songs written by Stephen Foster
 List of songs written by Super Junior
 List of songs written by Taecyeon
 List of songs written by Tove Lo
 List of songs written by Walter Afanasieff
 List of songs written by Willie Dixon
 List of songs written by Willie Nelson

Television shows

  List of Britannia High songs
  List of songs from Sesame Street
  List of songs in Smash
  List of songs in Victorious
  List of television theme music

Glee

  List of songs in Glee (season 1)
  List of songs in Glee (season 2)
  List of songs in Glee (season 3)
  List of songs in Glee (season 4)
  List of songs in Glee (season 5)

By reality television contestants

  List of American Idol Hot 100 singles
  Australian Idol discography
  Fame Academy discography
  Pop Idol discography
  Popstars (UK) discography
  The Voice (Australia) discography
  The Voice (U.S. TV series) discography
  The Voice UK discography
  The X Factor (Australia) discography
  The X Factor (U.S.) discography
  The X Factor (UK) discography

Eurovision
 List of Eurovision Song Contest entries (1956–2003)
 List of Eurovision Song Contest entries (2004–present)
 List of Junior Eurovision Song Contest entries

Topical

  List of songs about abortion
  List of calypsos with sociopolitical influences
  List of anti-war songs
  List of songs about bicycles
  List of birthday songs
  List of car crash songs
  List of songs about child abuse
  List of songs about close encounters with aliens
  List of songs about the Cold War
  Devil in popular culture
  List of songs about or referencing Elvis Presley
  List of songs about or referencing to serial killers
  List of charity songs for Hurricane Katrina relief
  List of songs about the September 11 attacks
  List of political punk songs
  List of songs about school
  List of songs about Clare
  List of songs about Louth
  List of songs about Tipperary
  List of songs about Wicklow
  List of train songs
  List of songs about the Vietnam War
  Role of music in World War II
  List of insect-inspired songs

By music type
  List of patter songs
  List of songs containing the 50s progression
  List of songs which use the Jew's harp

Unreleased songs
See

Video games
  List of downloadable songs for Rocksmith

Guitar Hero

  List of songs in Guitar Hero
  List of songs in Guitar Hero II
  List of songs in Guitar Hero III: Legends of Rock
  List of songs in Guitar Hero World Tour
  List of songs in Guitar Hero 5
  List of songs in Guitar Hero: Warriors of Rock
  List of songs in Guitar Hero Live
  List of songs in Guitar Hero: Aerosmith
  List of songs in Guitar Hero: Metallica
  List of songs in Guitar Hero: Van Halen
  List of songs in Guitar Hero Encore: Rocks the 80s
  List of songs in the Guitar Hero: On Tour series
  List of songs in DJ Hero
  List of songs in DJ Hero 2

Music video game soundtracks

  List of DJMax soundtracks
  List of Guitar Freaks and Drum Mania songs
  I Scream! list
  List of songs in The Idolmaster video games
  List of Karaoke Revolution songs
  List of downloadable songs for the Lips series
  List of songs in Lips
  List of songs in Lips: Canta en Español
  List of songs in Lips: Number One Hits
  List of songs in the Donkey Konga game series
  List: Make It Sweet!
  List of Para Para Paradise songs
  PaRappa the Party Mix
  PaRappa the Rapper (soundtrack)
  UmJammer Lammy (Original Soundtrack)
  List of songs in Wii Music

Dance Dance Revolution soundtracks

 Music of Dance Dance Revolution (1998 video game)
 Music of Dance Dance Revolution 2ndMix
 Music of Dance Dance Revolution (2009 video games)
 Music of Dance Dance Revolution Extreme
 Dance Dance Revolution Extreme 2 Limited Edition Music Sampler
 Dance Dance Revolution Extreme Limited Edition Music Sampler
 Dance Dance Revolution Ultramix 2 Limited Edition Music Sampler
 Music of Dance Dance Revolution X

Rock Band soundtracks

  List of songs in Rock Band
  List of songs in Rock Band 2
  List of songs in Rock Band 3
  List of songs in Rock Band 4
  List of songs in Rock Band Blitz
  List of songs in Rock Band Unplugged
  List of songs in The Beatles: Rock Band
  List of songs in Green Day: Rock Band
  List of songs in Lego Rock Band
  List of downloadable songs for the Rock Band series
  2007 in downloadable songs for the Rock Band series
  2008 in downloadable songs for the Rock Band series
  2009 in downloadable songs for the Rock Band series
  2010 in downloadable songs for the Rock Band series
  2011 in downloadable songs for the Rock Band series
  2012 in downloadable songs for the Rock Band series
  2013 in downloadable songs for the Rock Band series
  2015 in downloadable songs for the Rock Band series
  2016 in downloadable songs for the Rock Band series
  2017 in downloadable songs for the Rock Band series
  2018 in downloadable songs for the Rock Band series
  2019 in downloadable songs for the Rock Band series
  2020 in downloadable songs for the Rock Band series
  List of Rock Band Network songs
  List of Rock Band Network 1.0 songs
  List of Rock Band Network 2.0 songs
  List of Rock Band track packs

Singstar

  List of downloadable Danish songs for the SingStar series
  List of downloadable Dutch songs for the SingStar series
  List of downloadable English songs for the SingStar series
  List of downloadable Finnish songs for the SingStar series
  List of downloadable French songs for the SingStar series
  List of downloadable German songs for the SingStar series
  List of downloadable Hindi songs for the SingStar series
  List of downloadable Italian songs for the SingStar series
  List of downloadable Norwegian songs for the SingStar series
  List of downloadable Portuguese songs for the SingStar series
  List of downloadable songpacks for the SingStar series
  List of downloadable songs for the SingStar series
  List of downloadable Spanish songs for the SingStar series
  List of downloadable Swedish songs for the SingStar series
  List of songs in SingStar games (PlayStation 2)
  List of songs in SingStar games (PlayStation 3)

Miscellaneous/unsorted

  1000 Years of Popular Music
  2001 Clear Channel memorandum
  Charity record
  First music videos aired on MTV
  John Lennon's jukebox
  List of 2000s one-hit wonders in the United States
  List of 2010s one-hit wonders in the United States
  List of Basement Tapes songs (1975)
  List of Basement Tapes songs
  List of blackface minstrel songs
  List of Bob Dylan songs based on earlier tunes
  List of carols at the Nine Lessons and Carols, King's College Chapel
  List of charity songs for Hurricane Katrina relief
  List of Cornell University songs
  List of Dance Praise songs
  List of Don Omar collaborations
  List of English-language pop songs based on French-language songs
  List of folk songs by Roud number
  List of Guitar Praise songs
  List of Hannah Montana songs
  List of Haruhi Suzumiya character song singles
  List of interpolated songs
  List of Jean Michel Jarre compositions with multiple titles
  List of musical works in unusual time signatures
  List of musical works released in a stem format
  List of original Westlife songs
  List of political party songs
  List of popular music songs featuring Andalusian cadences
  List of Pump It Up Songs
  List of Runrig's Gaelic Songs
  List of silent musical compositions
  List of singles which have spent the most weeks on the UK Singles Chart
  List of songs banned by the BBC
  List of songs containing the I-V-vi-IV progression
  List of songs from Negima
  List of songs introduced by Frank Sinatra
  List of songs recorded by Zecchino d'Oro
  List of songs that retell a work of literature
  List of songs with Latin lyrics
  List of songs written and produced by Chris Braide
  List of tributes to Hank Williams
  List of tributes to Marvin Gaye
  List of UK hit singles by footballers
  List of Wisin & Yandel collaborations
  Nonsense song
  Pazz & Jop
  Peelennium
  Songs remixed by Hybrid

See also

 Lists of albums (article)
 Lists of albums (category)
 List of lists
 List song
 Novelty song
 Outline of music
 Sporting song